Chouxia is a genus of flowering plants belonging to the family Sapindaceae.

Its native range is Madagascar.

Species:

Chouxia bijugata 
Chouxia borealis 
Chouxia macrophylla 
Chouxia mollis 
Chouxia saboureaui 
Chouxia sorindeioides

References

Sapindaceae
Sapindaceae genera
Taxa named by René Paul Raymond Capuron